Muricauda olearia is a Gram-negative, rod-shaped and non-motile bacterium from the genus of Muricauda which has been isolated from seawater which was contaminated with crude oil from the west coast of Korea.

References

External links
Type strain of Muricauda olearia at BacDive -  the Bacterial Diversity Metadatabase

Further reading 
 
 

Flavobacteria
Bacteria described in 2009